Mike Perry (born September 15, 1991) is an American professional mixed martial artist. He currently competes in the Middleweight division in the Bare Knuckle Fighting Championship (BKFC). Perry has formerly competed for the Ultimate Fighting Championship (UFC), where he fought 15 times.

Background
Perry was born in Flint, Michigan, on September 15, 1991. For much of his life, he moved around to different schools between Michigan and Florida. He said, "(In Michigan) I was one of maybe 10 white kids in the whole school, so I was bullied a lot. It was the same thing at other schools. I wouldn’t back down, so I would get into fights." This instability led him to a path of drugs, house arrest, probation violation, and jail. Perry started training boxing at age 11. Upon his release from jail for burglary, he got a job as a trainer at a UFC gym in Winter Springs, Florida. His work as a trainer led to his career as a fighter.

Mixed martial arts career

Early career
Perry made his professional debut in September 2014, after completing 11 amateur fights with a record of 8–3. He competed for several regional promotions across the United States.  In just under two years, he fought nine times while finishing all of his opponents via KO/TKO.

Ultimate Fighting Championship

2016
Perry made his UFC debut on short notice against Lim Hyun-gyu on August 20, 2016, at UFC 202, after Sultan Aliev pulled out due to injury. At the official weigh-ins, Perry faked a handshake with Lim then put his hands up yelling to Lim, "You thought you had a friend, boy!" before screaming at his opponent. He defeated Lim via TKO in the first round after Perry dropped him twice with right hands, dropped him again with a left hook and then followed up with ground and pound before the referee jumped in to stop the fight.

During the fight against Lim, Perry's cornerman and fellow fighter Alex Nicholson shouted during the pre-fight introductions, "He can't even open his motherfucking eyes." Nicholson was accused of racism for this, as Lim is Korean. Nicholson later addressed the comment on Twitter, saying, "I respect every man who steps in the cage and my comments were insensitive towards Lim I was hype for my brother but It's all love no hate." On the Monday following the fight Perry said on The MMA Hour, "I don't think any of my competition can see me, and when I hit Lim, I opened a lot of people's eyes."

Perry faced Danny Roberts on October 8, 2016, at UFC 204. At the official weigh-ins, Perry took a bite from a bar of chocolate and then told Roberts he was going to eat him alive. He defeated Roberts via KO late in the third round after Perry hurt him with a knee from the clinch, dropped him with a right hand and then followed up with ground and pound before the referee jumped in to stop the fight. The referee Marc Goddard appeared to stop the fight late, issuing an apology after the event via Twitter.

Perry faced Alan Jouban, on December 17, 2016, at UFC on Fox 22. At the official weigh-ins, Perry took a polaroid photo of Jouban and then tried to hand the photo to him as they traded words, but Jouban slapped it away with his hand and Perry aggressively feigned movement towards him while sticking his tongue out. He lost the fight by unanimous decision.

2017
Perry faced Jake Ellenberger on April 22, 2017, at UFC Fight Night 108. He defeated Ellenberger via KO in the second round after Perry dropped him with a left hook early in round two then finished with a standing elbow from the clinch 30 seconds later. Perry was awarded a $50,000 Performance of the Night bonus.

Perry was expected to face Thiago Alves on September 16, 2017, at UFC Fight Night 116. Alves was pulled from the event and was replaced by promotional newcomer Alex Reyes. Perry won the fight via knockout in the first round. The win also earned Perry his second Performance of the Night bonus award.

Perry faced Santiago Ponzinibbio on December 16, 2017, at UFC on Fox: Lawler vs. dos Anjos. He lost the fight by unanimous decision.

2018
Perry faced Max Griffin on February 24, 2018, at UFC on Fox: Emmett vs. Stephens. He lost the fight via unanimous decision.

Perry was expected to face Yancy Medeiros on July 7, 2018, at UFC 226. However, Medeiros pulled out of the fight on June 27, citing a rib injury. The following day, it was announced that Paul Felder would step in to face Perry in a Welterweight bout at the same event. Perry won the fight via split decision.

Perry faced Donald Cerrone on November 10, 2018, at UFC Fight Night 139. Perry lost the fight via submission due to an armbar in round one, marking the first time he had been finished in a professional mixed martial arts contest.

2019
After the fight with Cerrone, Perry signed a new four-fight contract with the UFC and faced Alex Oliveira on April 27, 2019, at UFC Fight Night: Jacaré vs. Hermansson. He won the back-and-forth fight by unanimous decision. The win also earned Perry his first Fight of the Night bonus award.

Perry faced Vicente Luque on August 10, 2019, at UFC on ESPN+ 14. He lost the fight via split decision.  This fight earned him the Fight of the Night award. As a result, Perry was expected to be sidelined for the remainder of 2019 after undergoing surgery to correct facial injuries sustained during the Luque fight.

As the first bout of his new four-fight contract, Perry faced Geoff Neal on December 14, 2019, at UFC 245. He lost the bout via first-round technical knockout, marking the first loss in his MMA career by knockout.

2020
Perry faced Mickey Gall on June 27, 2020, at UFC on ESPN: Poirier vs. Hooker. He won the fight via unanimous decision.

Perry was expected to face Robbie Lawler on November 21, 2020, at UFC 255. However, Lawler pulled out of the fight in late October, citing an undisclosed injury. Perry instead faced Tim Means at the same event. At the weigh-ins on November 20, Perry missed weight, weighing in at 175.5 pounds, over the non-title welterweight limit of 171.0 pounds. As a result, the bout proceeded at a catchweight and Perry was fined 30 percent of his purse, which went to Means. Perry lost the fight via unanimous decision.

2021
Mike Perry faced Daniel Rodriguez on April 10, 2021, at UFC on ABC 2. He lost the bout via unanimous decision.

Bare-knuckle boxing
On October 26, 2021, it was announced that Mike Perry signed a contract with Bare Knuckle Fighting Championship (BKFC) after his UFC contract expired.

On November 27, 2021, Perry faced boxer Michael Seals in a boxing vs MMA card promoted by Triller that featured other UFC veterans, with fighters wearing MMA gloves instead of traditional boxing gloves. Perry won the fight via split decision.

Perry made his BKFC debut against Julian Lane at Bare Knuckle Fighting Championship: Knucklemania 2 on February 19, 2022. After knocking down Lane in round one, Perry won the fight via unanimous decision.

Perry faced Bellator MMA veteran Michael Page on August 20, 2022 in the main event at Bare Knuckle Fighting Championship 27: London. After the first five rounds went to a split draw, Perry won the sixth round to win the fight via majority decision.

Grappling

Submission Underground
On February 23, 2020, Perry faced Al Iaquinta in a grappling contest at Chael Sonnen's Submission Underground 11 event. He won the match via fastest escape time.

Personal life 
Perry married professional tennis player Danielle Nickerson in 2019, after five years of dating. They separated in 2020. For his fight against Mickey Gall in June 2020, Perry's corner consisted solely of his girlfriend Latory Gonzalez. On January 6, 2021, Gonzalez gave birth to their first son, Ocean.

Controversies

Self defense situation in Orlando
On New Year's Eve 2016, Perry was involved in an altercation in Orlando, Florida. A stranger allegedly approached Perry's girlfriend and punched Perry after Perry told him to go away, Perry returned a left hook that left the attacker unconscious.

Homophobic and racist slurs 
Perry has received criticism for his use of homophobic and racist slurs. In response to complaints by fans and fellow mixed martial artists over his use of the word "nigga", Perry posted a video on social media to state that a DNA test had shown he has 2% African ancestry. Perry issued a public apology for his past use of the N-word and vowed not to use it again, citing his desire to set a better example for his son.

Restaurant fights in Texas
In July 2020, Perry was questioned by police due to an incident at a restaurant in Lubbock, Texas, where three people were allegedly assaulted. Part of the incident was filmed, showing an elderly man and Perry in a heated dispute. The man lunged towards Perry, and Perry threw a right-hand punch. The man was unconscious when police arrived on the scene and he was hospitalized. Perry was charged with class A assault, a misdemeanor. Perry said his actions were a response to others initiating physical contact with him.  During the incident, Perry was also reported to have attacked a restaurant staffer, become involved in a physical altercation with a woman, and repeatedly used the racial slur "nigga."

Domestic violence allegations 
On October 20, 2020, Perry's ex-wife Danielle Nickerson gave an interview to the industry website MMA Junkie in which she described repeated incidents of verbal and physical abuse by Perry. Nickerson claimed that in February of 2020, Perry became angry after an altercation with a woman at a bar. Once the couple returned home, Perry took his frustrations out on Nickerson by taking her to the ground and hitting her with a barrage of punches that bruised her face. After the incident Nickerson was picked up by Perry's mother, Sabra Young, and taken to Young's home. When Perry followed Nickerson to the Young residence, Young locked him out of the house and called 911. Nickerson also alleged that during a prior incident, Perry struck her in the forehead while wearing his wedding ring, leaving a hematoma. Nickerson said that the abuse grew so severe that she filed for a restraining order against Perry after the dissolution of their romantic relationship. Perry denies the allegations and no charges were filed.

Championships and accomplishments
Ultimate Fighting Championship
Performance of the Night (Two times) vs. Jake Ellenberger and Alex Reyes
Fight of the Night (Two times)

Mixed martial arts record

|-
|Loss
|align=center|14–8
|Daniel Rodriguez
|Decision (unanimous)
|UFC on ABC: Vettori vs. Holland
|
|align=center|3
|align=center|5:00
|Las Vegas, Nevada, United States
|
|-
|Loss
|align=center|14–7
|Tim Means 
|Decision (unanimous)
|UFC 255
|
|align=center|3
|align=center|5:00
|Las Vegas, Nevada, United States
|
|-
|Win
|align=center|14–6
|Mickey Gall
|Decision (unanimous)
|UFC on ESPN: Poirier vs. Hooker
|
|align=center|3
|align=center|5:00
|Las Vegas, Nevada, United States
|
|-
|Loss
|align=center|13–6
|Geoff Neal
|TKO (head kick and punches)
|UFC 245 
|
|align=center|1
|align=center|1:30
|Las Vegas, Nevada, United States
|
|-
|Loss
|align=center|13–5
|Vicente Luque
|Decision (split)
|UFC Fight Night: Shevchenko vs. Carmouche 2 
|
|align=center|3
|align=center|5:00
|Montevideo, Uruguay
|
|-
|Win
|align=center|13–4
|Alex Oliveira
|Decision (unanimous)
|UFC Fight Night: Jacaré vs. Hermansson 
|
|align=center|3
|align=center|5:00
|Sunrise, Florida, United States
|
|-
|Loss
|align=center|12–4
|Donald Cerrone
|Submission (armbar)
|UFC Fight Night: The Korean Zombie vs. Rodríguez 
|
|align=center|1
|align=center|4:46
|Denver, Colorado, United States
|
|- 
|Win
|align=center|12–3
|Paul Felder
|Decision (split)
|UFC 226 
|
|align=center|3
|align=center|5:00
|Las Vegas, Nevada, United States
|
|- 
|Loss
|align=center|11–3
|Max Griffin
|Decision (unanimous)
|UFC on Fox: Emmett vs. Stephens 
|
|align=center|3
|align=center|5:00
|Orlando, Florida, United States
|
|-
|Loss
|align=center|11–2
|Santiago Ponzinibbio
|Decision (unanimous)
|UFC on Fox: Lawler vs. dos Anjos 
|
|align=center|3
|align=center|5:00
|Winnipeg, Manitoba, Canada
|
|-
|Win
|align=center|11–1
|Alex Reyes
|KO (knee)
|UFC Fight Night: Rockhold vs. Branch 
|
|align=center|1
|align=center|1:19
|Pittsburgh, Pennsylvania, United States
|
|-
|Win
|align=center|10–1
|Jake Ellenberger
|KO (elbow)
|UFC Fight Night: Swanson vs. Lobov
|
|align=center|2
|align=center|1:05
|Nashville, Tennessee, United States
|
|-
|Loss
|align=center|9–1
|Alan Jouban
|Decision (unanimous)
|UFC on Fox: VanZant vs. Waterson
|
|align=center|3
|align=center|5:00
|Sacramento, California, United States
| 
|-
|Win
|align=center|9–0
|Danny Roberts
| KO (knee and punches)
|UFC 204
|
|align=center|3
|align=center|4:40
|Manchester, England
|
|-
| Win
| align=center| 8–0
| Lim Hyun-gyu
| TKO (punches)
| UFC 202
| 
| align=center| 1
| align=center| 3:38
| Las Vegas, Nevada, United States
| 
|-
| Win
| align=center| 7–0
| David Mundell
| KO (punches)
| Battleground: Perry vs. Mundell
| 
| align=center| 2
| align=center| 4:10
| Kissimmee, Florida, United States
|
|-
| Win
| align=center| 6–0
| Frank Carrillo
| KO (punch)
| Square Ring Promotions: Island Fights 37
| 
| align=center| 1
| align=center| 3:40
| Pensacola, Florida, United States 
|
|-
| Win
| align=center| 5–0
| Jon Manley
| TKO (knees and punches)
| Premier FC 18 
| 
| align=center| 2
| align=center| 3:32
| Springfield, Massachusetts, United States
| 
|-
| Win
| align=center| 4–0
| Micheal Roberts
| KO (punches)
| Bahamas Open Martial Arts Championship 2
| 
| align=center| 1
| align=center| 5:16
| New Providence, Bahamas
| 
|-
| Win
| align=center| 3–0
| Preston Parsons
| TKO (punches)
| House of Fame 3: Riverside Beatdown
| 
| align=center| 1
| align=center| 4:49
| Jacksonville, Florida, United States
|
|-
|  Win
| align=center| 2–0
| James Rodriguez
| KO (punches)
| Florida Championship Fighting
| 
| align=center| 1
| align=center| 2:22
| Orlando, Florida, United States
| 
|-
| Win
| align=center| 1–0
| Hector Tirado
| KO (punches)
| Top Alliance Combat 3
| 
| align=center| 1
| align=center| 3:52
| McDonough, Georgia, United States
|
|-

Professional boxing record 

{|class="wikitable" style="text-align:center; font-size:95%"
|-
!
!Result
!Record
!Opponent
!Type
!Round, time
!Date
!Location
!Notes
|-
|1
|Loss
|0–1
|align=left| Kenneth McNeil
|
|4 (4), 0:52
|Mar 28, 2015
|align=left|

Bare knuckle record

|-
|
|align=center|–
|Luke Rockhold
|–
|BKFC 41
|
|align=center|6
|align=center|2:00
|Denver, Colorado
|
|-
|Win
|align=center|2–0
|Michael Page
|Decision (majority)
|BKFC 27: London
|
|align=center|6
|align=center|2:00
|London, England
|
|-
|Win
|align=center|1–0
|Julian Lane
|Decision (unanimous)
|BKFC: KnuckleMania 2
|
|align=center|5
|align=center|2:00
|Hollywood, Florida, United States
|
|-

Triad combat record 

{|class="wikitable" style="text-align:center; font-size:95%"
|-
!
!Result
!Record
!Opponent
!Type
!Round, time
!Date
!Location
!Notes
|-
|1
|Win
|1–0
|align=left| Michael Seals
|
|7 
|November 27, 2021 
|align=left|
|

See also 
 List of male mixed martial artists

References

External links

1991 births
Living people
Sportspeople from Flint, Michigan
American male mixed martial artists
Welterweight mixed martial artists
Mixed martial artists utilizing boxing
Mixed martial artists utilizing Brazilian jiu-jitsu
Ultimate Fighting Championship male fighters
Mixed martial artists from Michigan
American practitioners of Brazilian jiu-jitsu